Looi is a surname.

Origins
Like many other similarly-spelled surnames (Lui, Loi, Louie, etc.), it can originate from either of two Chinese surnames which are almost homophonous in Cantonese, though pronounced distinctly in Mandarin:

Léi, meaning "thunder". The spelling Looi might also originate from its pronunciation in various Southern Min dialects, e.g. Hokkien or Chaoshan.
Lǚ, a toponymic surname from the ancient state of Lü (note the differing tone). The pronunciation in other varieties of Chinese is not similar to the surname meaning "thunder".

As a Dutch surname, Looi originated both as shortened version of van de Looi with the tussenvoegsels dropped, and as a patronymic surname derived from the given name Looi. That given name is a regional hypocorism of various other given names: it may be short for Ludolf, or for Lodewijk in Groningen and the southern Netherlands, or for Eligius in Friesland. Alternative spellings include Looij.

Statistics
In the Netherlands, there were nine people with the surname Looi and 35 people with the surname van de Looi as of 2007, up from three and nine respectively in 1947.

People
People with the surname Looi include:

Looi Loon Teik (born 1945), Malaysian footballer
Beatrice Looi (born 1967), Malaysian bridal gown designer
Melinda Looi (born ), Malaysian prêt-a-porter and couture fashion designer

People with the surname van de Looi include:

Erwin van de Looi (born 1972), Dutch football manager
Tom van de Looi (born 1999), Dutch football midfielder

See also
Van Looy, also a Dutch surname

References

Chinese-language surnames
Multiple Chinese surnames
Cantonese-language surnames